Myxosargus is a genus of flies in the family Stratiomyidae.

Species
Myxosargus anomalus James, 1979
Myxosargus braueri Williston, 1888
Myxosargus fasciatus Brauer, 1882
Myxosargus guatemalae James, 1942
Myxosargus knowltoni Curran, 1929
Myxosargus melanaspis James, 1979
Myxosargus mystaceus James, 1979
Myxosargus nigricormis Greene, 1918
Myxosargus pacificus James, 1979
Myxosargus panamensis Curran, 1929
Myxosargus rugosifrons James, 1979
Myxosargus scutellatus Williston, 1900
Myxosargus texensis Curran, 1929

References

Stratiomyidae
Brachycera genera
Taxa named by Friedrich Moritz Brauer
Diptera of South America
Diptera of North America